Henry Lafayette King (April 7, 1922 – June 5, 1983) was an American football player who played four seasons in the All-America Football Conference. "Fay" King played college football at the University of Georgia.He was drafted by the Rams of the National Football League in the seventh round of the 1946 NFL Draft.

References
 

1922 births
1983 deaths
Buffalo Bisons (AAFC) players
American football ends
Georgia Bulldogs football players
Players of American football from Alabama
Buffalo Bills (AAFC) players
Chicago Rockets players
Chicago Hornets players